The Boston College Eagles women's hockey team will represent Boston College in the 2011–12 NCAA Division I women's ice hockey season. The Terriers are coached by Katie King and attempted to become the first team in Hockey East to win the NCAA Frozen Four championship game.

Offseason
August 9: Eight current and former Eagles players were invited to the 2011 USA Hockey Women's National Festival in Blaine, Minnesota (from August 10–20). The players include Allie Thunstrom, Molly Schaus, Kelli Stack, Blake Bolden, Mary Restuccia, Taylor Wasylk, Alex Carpenter, and Megan Miller.
 Sept. 20: Boston College was ranked No. 5 on the USCHO.com Division I Women's preseason poll. This is the highest preseason ranking in Eagles history. In addition, the top 10 ranking marks the sixth time in seven seasons that the Eagles have been ranked in the USCHO.com preseason poll.

Recruiting

Exhibition

Regular season
Jan. 5-6: Mary Restuccia had a hand in all four Boston College goals. In the first game, she assisted on the Eagles lone goal in a 2-1 loss to St. Lawrence. The following day, Restuccia assisted on all three Boston College goals, as the Eagles defeated Clarkson by a 3-2 score.

Standings

Schedule

Conference record

Awards and honors
Corinne Boyles, Hockey East Rookie of the Week (Week of November 21, 2011)
Corinne Boyles, Hockey East Goaltender of the Month (Month of December 2011)
Dru Burns, Hockey East Co-Player of the Week (Week of November 28, 2011)
Alexandra Carpenter, Hockey East Rookie of the Month (Month of October 2011)
Alexandra Carpenter, Hockey East Rookie of the Month (Month of December 2011)
Emily Field, Hockey East Player of the Week (Week of October 24, 2011)
Mary Restuccia, Hockey East Player of the Week (Week of January 9. 2012)
Hockey East Team of the Week (Week of October 24, 2011)
Hockey East Team of the Week (Week of November 21, 2011)

References

Boston College Eagles women's ice hockey seasons
Boston College
NCAA women's ice hockey Frozen Four seasons
Boston College Eagles women's ice hockey season
Boston College Eagles women's ice hockey season
Boston College Eagles women's ice hockey season
Boston College Eagles women's ice hockey season